Plowden may refer to:

Plowden, Shropshire, village in Shropshire, England

People with the surname Plowden
 Alfred Chichele Plowden (1844–1914), English barrister and court magistrate
 Alison Plowden (1931–2007), English historian and biographer
 Bridget Plowden, Lady Plowden (1910–2000), English educationist, reformer
 David Plowden (born 1932), American photographer
 Edmund Plowden (1518–1585), English lawyer, legal scholar and theorist
 Edmund Plowden (colonial governor) (1590–1659), explorer and colonial governor 
 Edwin Plowden, Baron Plowden (1907–2001), English industrial and public servant
 Francis Plowden (politician) (c.1644–1712), English Jacobite official
 Francis Peter Plowden (1749–1829), English barrister and writer.
 Francis Plowden (British Army officer) (1851–1911), British general
 Francis Plowden (businessman) (born 1945), lay member of the U. K. Judicial Appointments Commission
 Henry Plowden (1840-1920), English cricketer
 Luke Ishikawa Plowden (1995), Japanese-American actor
 Robert Plowden (1740–1823), English Jesuit priest
 Thomas Plowden (1594–1664), English Jesuit priest, translator
 Walter Plowden (1820–1860), British consul in Ethiopia
 William Plowden (Conservative politician) (1787–1880), English politician
 William Chichele Plowden (1832–1915), Member of the Legislative Council in India, British Member of Parliament
 William Julius Lowthian Plowden (1935–26 June 2010) was a British political science academic and government advisor.

See also
 Plowden Report (named after Bridget Plowden)
Plowden Hall